is a passenger railway station in the town of Okutama, Tokyo, Japan, operated by the East Japan Railway Company (JR East).

Lines
Kawai Station is served by the Ōme Line, located 30.0 kilometers from the terminus of the line at Tachikawa Station.

Station layout
The station has one side platform, serving a single bi-directional track. The station is unattended.

Platform

History
The station opened on 1 July 1944. It became part of the East Japan Railway Company (JR East) with the breakup of the Japanese National Railways on 1 April 1987.

Passenger statistics
In fiscal 2010, the station was used by an average of 233 passengers daily (boarding passengers only).

Surrounding area

Tama River

See also
 List of railway stations in Japan

References

External links 

 JR East Station information 

Railway stations in Tokyo
Ōme Line
Stations of East Japan Railway Company
Railway stations in Japan opened in 1944
Okutama, Tokyo